Rimvydas Raimondas Survila (born 5 December 1939 in Šiauliai) is a Lithuanian politician. In 1990 he was among those who signed the Act of the Re-Establishment of the State of Lithuania.

References
Biography 

1939 births
Living people
Members of the Seimas
Politicians from Šiauliai
20th-century Lithuanian politicians